The yeast Saccharomyces cerevisiae is a simple single-celled eukaryote with both a diploid and haploid mode of existence. The mating of yeast only occurs between haploids, which can be either the a or α (alpha) mating type and thus display simple sexual differentiation. Mating type is determined by a single locus, MAT, which in turn governs the sexual behaviour of both haploid and diploid cells. Through a form of genetic recombination, haploid yeast can switch mating type as often as every cell cycle.

Mating type and the life cycle of Saccharomyces cerevisiae
S. cerevisiae (yeast) can stably exist as either a diploid or a haploid. Both haploid and diploid yeast cells reproduce by mitosis, with daughter cells budding off of mother cells. Haploid cells are capable of mating with other haploid cells of the opposite mating type (an a cell can only mate with an α cell, and vice versa) to produce a stable diploid cell. Diploid cells, usually upon facing stressful conditions such as nutrient depletion, can undergo meiosis to produce four haploid spores: two a spores and two α spores.

Differences between a and α cells

a cells produce 'a-factor', a mating pheromone which signals the presence of an a cell to neighbouring α cells. a cells respond to α-factor, the α cell mating pheromone, by growing a projection (known as a shmoo, due to its distinctive shape resembling the Al Capp cartoon character Shmoo) towards the source of α-factor. Similarly, α cells produce α-factor, and respond to a-factor by growing a projection towards the source of the pheromone. The response of haploid cells only to the mating pheromones of the opposite mating type allows mating between a and α cells, but not between cells of the same mating type.

These phenotypic differences between a and α cells are due to a different set of genes being actively transcribed and repressed in cells of the two mating types. a cells activate genes which produce a-factor and produce a cell surface receptor (Ste2) which binds to α-factor and triggers signaling within the cell. a cells also repress the genes associated with being an α cell. Similarly, α cells activate genes which produce α-factor and produce a cell surface receptor (Ste3) which binds and responds to a-factor, and α cells repress the genes associated with being an a cell.

The MAT locus 
The different sets of transcriptional repression and activation which characterize a and α cells are caused by the presence of one of two alleles of a mating-type locus called MAT: MATa or MATα located on chromosome III. The MAT locus is usually divided into five regions (W, X, Y, Z1, and Z2) based on the sequences shared among the two mating types. The difference lies in the Y region (Ya and Yα), which contains most of the genes and promoters.

The MATa allele of MAT encodes a gene called a1, which in haploids direct the transcription of the a-specific transcriptional program (such as expressing STE2 and repressing STE3) that defines an a cell. The MATα allele of MAT encodes the α1 and α2 genes, which in haploids direct the transcription of the α-specific transcriptional program (such as expressing STE3, repressing STE2, producing prepro-α-factor) which causes the cell to be an α cell. S. cerevisiae has an a2 gene with no apparent function that shares much of its sequence with α2; however, other yeasts like Candida albicans do have a functional and distinct MATa2 gene.

Differences between haploid and diploid cells

Haploid cells are one of two mating types (a or α), and respond to the mating pheromone produced by haploid cells of the opposite mating type, and can mate with cells of the opposite mating type. Haploid cells cannot undergo meiosis. Diploid cells do not produce or respond to either mating pheromone and do not mate, but can undergo meiosis to produce four haploid cells.

Like the differences between haploid a and α cells, different patterns of gene repression and activation are responsible for the phenotypic differences between haploid and diploid cells. In addition to the specific a and α transcriptional patterns, haploid cells of both mating types share a haploid transcriptional pattern which activates haploid-specific genes (such as HO) and represses diploid-specific genes (such as IME1). Similarly, diploid cells activate diploid-specific genes and repress haploid-specific genes.

The different gene expression patterns of haploids and diploids are again due to the MAT locus. Haploid cells only contain one copy of each of the 16 chromosomes and thus can only possess one allele of MAT (either MATa or MATα), which determines their mating type. Diploid cells result from the mating of an a cell and an α cell, and thus possess 32 chromosomes (in 16 pairs), including one chromosome bearing the MATa allele and another chromosome bearing the MATα allele. The combination of the information encoded by the MATa allele (the a1 gene) and the MATα allele (the α1 and α2 genes) triggers the diploid transcriptional program. Similarly, the presence of only a single allele of MAT, whether it is MATa or MATα, triggers the haploid transcriptional program.

The alleles present at the MAT locus are sufficient to program the mating behaviour of the cell. For example, using genetic manipulations, a MATa allele can be added to a MATα haploid cell. Despite having a haploid complement of chromosomes, the cell now has both the MATa and MATα alleles, and will behave like a diploid cell: it will not produce or respond to mating pheromones, and when starved will attempt to undergo meiosis, with fatal results. Similarly, deletion of one copy of the MAT locus in a diploid cell, leaving only a single MATa or MATα allele, will cause a cell with a diploid complement of chromosomes to behave like a haploid cell.

Decision to mate

Mating in yeast is stimulated by the presence of a pheromone which binds to either the Ste2 receptor (in a-cells) or the Ste3 receptor (in α-cells). The binding of this pheromone then leads to the activation of a heterotrimeric G protein. The dimeric portion of this G-protein recruits Ste5 (and its related MAPK cascade components) to the membrane, and ultimately results in the phosphorylation of Fus3.

The switching mechanism arises as a result of competition between the Fus3 protein (a MAPK protein) and the phosphatase Ptc1. These proteins both attempt to control the 4 phosphorylation sites of Ste5, a scaffold protein with Fus3 attempting to phosphorylate the phosphosites, and Ptc1 attempting to dephosphorylate them.

Presence of α-factor induces recruitment of Ptc1 to Ste5 via a 4 amino acid motif located within the Ste5 phosphosites. Ptc1 then dephosphorylates Ste5, ultimately resulting in the dissociation of the Fus3-Ste5 complex. Fus3 dissociates in a switch-like manner, dependent on the phosphorylation state of the 4 phosphosites. All 4 phosphosites must be dephosphorylated in order for Fus3 to dissociate. Fus3's ability to compete with Ptc1 decreases as Ptc1 is recruited, and thus the rate of dephosphorylation increases with the presence of pheromone.

Kss1, a homologue of Fus3, does not affect shmooing, and does not contribute to the switch-like mating decision.

In yeast, mating as well as the production of shmoos occur via an all-or-none, switch-like mechanism. This switch-like mechanism allows yeast cells to avoid making an unwise commitment to a highly demanding procedure. However, not only does the mating decision need to be conservative (in order to avoid wasting energy), but it must also be fast to avoid losing the potential mate.

The decision to mate is extremely sensitive. There are 3 ways in which this ultrasensitivity is maintained:
Multi-site phosphorylation – Fus3 only dissociates from Ste5 and becomes fully active when all 4 of the phosphosites are dephosphorylated. Even one phosphorylated site will result in immunity to α-factor.
Two-stage binding – Fus3 and Ptc1 bind to separate docking sites on Ste5. Only after docking can they bind to, and act on, the phosphosites.
Steric hindrance – competition between Fus3 and Ptc1 to control the 4 phosphosites on Ste3

[a and α yeast share the same mating response pathway, with the only difference being the type of receptor each mating type possesses. Thus the above description, given for a-type yeast stimulated with α-factor, works equally well for α-type yeast stimulated with a-factor.]

Mating type switching

Wild type haploid yeast are capable of switching mating type between a and α. Consequently, even if a single haploid cell of a given mating type founds a colony of yeast, mating type switching will cause cells of both a and α mating types to be present in the population. Combined with the strong drive for haploid cells to mate with cells of the opposite mating type and form diploids, mating type switching and consequent mating will cause the majority of cells in a colony to be diploid, regardless of whether a haploid or diploid cell founded the colony. The vast majority of yeast strains studied in laboratories have been altered such that they cannot perform mating type switching (by deletion of the HO gene; see below); this allows the stable propagation of haploid yeast, as haploid cells of the a mating type will remain a cells (and α cells will remain α cells), and will not form diploids.

HML and HMR: the silent mating cassettes
Haploid yeast switch mating type by replacing the information present at the MAT locus. For example, an a cell will switch to an α cell by replacing the MATa allele with the MATα allele. This replacement of one allele of MAT for the other is possible because yeast cells carry an additional silenced copy of both the MATa and MATα alleles: the HML (homothallic mating left) locus typically carries a silenced copy of the MATα allele, and the HMR (homothallic mating right) locus typically carries a silenced copy of the MATa allele. The silent HML and HMR loci are often referred to as the silent mating cassettes, as the information present there is 'read into' the active MAT locus.

These additional copies of the mating type information do not interfere with the function of whatever allele is present at the MAT locus because they are not expressed, so a haploid cell with the MATa allele present at the active MAT locus is still an a cell, despite also having a (silenced) copy of the MATα allele present at HML. Only the allele present at the active MAT locus is transcribed, and thus only the allele present at MAT will influence cell behaviour. Hidden mating type loci are epigenetically silenced by SIR proteins, which form a heterochromatin scaffold that prevents transcription from the silent mating cassettes.

Mechanics of the mating type switch

The process of mating type switching is a gene conversion event initiated by the HO gene. The HO gene is a tightly regulated haploid-specific gene that is only activated in haploid cells during the G1 phase of the cell cycle. The protein encoded by the HO gene is a DNA endonuclease, which physically cleaves DNA, but only at the MAT locus (due to the DNA sequence specificity of the HO endonuclease).

Once HO cuts the DNA at MAT, exonucleases are attracted to the cut DNA ends and begin to degrade the DNA on both sides of the cut site. This DNA degradation by exonucleases eliminates the DNA which encoded the MAT allele; however, the resulting gap in the DNA is repaired by copying in the genetic information present at either HML or HMR, filling in a new allele of either the MATa or MATα gene. Thus, the silenced alleles of MATa and MATα present at HML and HMR serve as a source of genetic information to repair the HO-induced DNA damage at the active MAT locus.

Directionality of the mating type switch
The repair of the MAT locus after cutting by the HO endonuclease almost always results in a mating type switch. When an a cell cuts the MATa allele present at the MAT locus, the cut at MAT will almost always be repaired by copying the information present at HML. This results in MAT being repaired to the MATα allele, switching the mating type of the cell from a to α. Similarly, an α cell which has its MATα allele cut by the HO endonuclease will almost always repair the damage using the information present at HMR, copying the MATa gene to the MAT locus and switching the mating type of α cell to a.

This is the result of the action of a recombination enhancer (RE)  located on the left arm of chromosome III. Deletion of this region causes a cells to incorrectly repair using HMR. In a cells, Mcm1 binds to the RE and promotes recombination of the HML region. In α cells, the α2 factor binds at the RE and establishes a repressive domain over RE such that recombination is unlikely to occur. An innate bias means that the default behaviour is repair from HMR. The exact mechanisms of these interactions are still under investigation.

Mating and inbreeding
Ruderfer et al. analyzed the ancestry of natural S. cerevisiae strains and concluded that matings involving out-crossing occur only about once every 50,000 cell divisions. Thus it appears that, in nature, mating is most often between closely related yeast cells. Mating occurs when haploid cells of opposite mating type MATa and MATα come into contact. Ruderfer et al. pointed out that such contacts are frequent between closely related yeast cells for two reasons. The first is that cells of opposite mating type are present together in the same ascus, the sac that contains the cells directly produced by a single meiosis, and these cells can mate with each other. The second reason is that haploid cells of one mating type, upon cell division, often produce cells of the opposite mating type with which they can mate (see section "Mating type switching", above). The relative rarity in nature of meiotic events that result from out-crossing appears to be inconsistent with the idea that production of genetic variation is the primary selective force maintaining mating capability in this organism. However this finding is consistent with the alternative idea that the primary selective force maintaining mating capability is enhanced recombinational repair of DNA damage during meiosis, since this benefit is realized during each meiosis subsequent to a mating, whether or not out-crossing occurs.

In other yeasts

Fission yeast
Schizosaccharomyces pombe is a facultative sexual yeast that can undergo mating when nutrients are limiting. Exposure of S. pombe to hydrogen peroxide, an agent that causes oxidative stress leading to oxidative DNA damage, strongly induces mating, meiosis, and formation of meiotic spores. This finding suggests that meiosis, and particularly meiotic recombination, may be an adaptation for repairing DNA damage. The overall structure of the MAT locus is similar to that in S. cerevisiae. The mating-type switching system is similar, but has evolved independently.

Self-mating in Cryptococcus neoformans
Cryptococcus neoformans is a basidiomycetous fungus that grows as a budding yeast in culture and in an infected host. C. neoformans causes life-threatening meningoencephalitis in immune compromised patients. It undergoes a filamentous transition during the sexual cycle to produce spores, the suspected infectious agent. The vast majority of environmental and clinical isolates of C. neoformans are mating type α. Filaments ordinarily have haploid nuclei, but these can undergo a process of diploidization (perhaps by endoduplication or stimulated nuclear fusion) to form diploid cells termed blastospores. The diploid nuclei of blastospores can then undergo meiosis, including recombination, to form haploid basidiospores that can then be dispersed. This process is referred to as monokaryotic fruiting. Required for this process is a gene designated dmc1, a conserved homologue of genes RecA in bacteria, and RAD51 in eukaryotes. Dmc1 mediates homologous chromosome pairing during meiosis and repair of double-strand breaks in DNA (see Meiosis; also Michod et al.). Lin et al. suggested that one benefit of meiosis in C. neoformans could be to promote DNA repair in a DNA damaging environment that could include the defensive responses of the infected host.

References

External links
Fungi Can Tell Us About The Origin Of Sex Chromosomes: study shows that there are great similarities between the parts of DNA that determine the sex of plants and animals and the parts of DNA that determine mating types in certain fungi. Accessed 5 April 2008.
Andrew Murray's Seminar: Yeast Sex

Mating
Molecular biology
Molecular genetics
Mycology
Sexual dimorphism